Robert Thomas Teamoh (March 25, 1864 - 1912) was a newspaper reporter and  state legislator in Massachusetts. He was born in the state and lived in Brookline and was the son of Thomas and Margaret Patterson Teamoh. He was the nephew of Virginia state senator George Teamoh.

In 1894 he married Julia Jackson. He represented Ward 9. He was part of a delegation of legislators that visited Virginia. Charles Triplett O'Ferrall, Virginia's governor refused the meet with the delegation while Teamoh was part of it so he waited outside. This caused some outrage and protest in Massachusetts.

He was succeeded in office by William L. Reed.
He was a known Freemason and worked for the Boston Globe for over 20 years.

See also
George Teamoh

References

1864 births
1912 deaths
Republican Party members of the Massachusetts House of Representatives
People from Brookline, Massachusetts
African-American politicians during the Reconstruction Era
African-American state legislators in Massachusetts
The Boston Globe people
20th-century African-American people